Clash by Night is a 1952 American film noir drama directed by Fritz Lang and starring Barbara Stanwyck, Paul Douglas, Robert Ryan, Marilyn Monroe and Keith Andes. The film is based on the 1941 play by Clifford Odets, adapted for the screen by writer Alfred Hayes. It is the first major film to credit Monroe before the title, albeit with fourth billing.

During the shooting, the now-famous nude calendar photos of Monroe surfaced and reporters swarmed around and hounded the actress, creating considerable distraction for the filmmakers.

Plot

Mae Doyle returns to her hometown, the fishing town of Monterey, California, after 10 years on the East Coast. Joe, her fisherman brother, is not pleased to see her, but accepts her back into the family home. His girlfriend Peggy is more welcoming. When Joe asks Mae about the rich man whom she had been seeing, she explains that he was a married politician. He died and left her some money, but his wife and relatives took her to court and won.

Mae begins to date Jerry D'Amato, a good-natured, unsophisticated fisherman with his own boat. Almost immediately, Mae despises Jerry's friend, Earl Pfeiffer, a bitter, dissatisfied film projectionist. Mae's politician lover had made her feel more confident in herself; in stark contrast, Earl has a low opinion of women and makes no attempt to hide it. His wife is a vaudeville performer who is frequently away on tour.

Despite Mae's opinion of Earl, he senses a kindred, and restless spirit between the two of them. Jerry is oblivious to the tension between the two and soon asks Mae to marry him, despite her warning that she is not good for him. Mae accepts, even though she does not love or even respect her future husband, for security and in the hope that she can change.

A year after having a baby girl with Jerry, Mae becomes bored and restless. Earl, now divorced, makes a move on Mae. She resists at first, but then begins an affair with him. Jerry's uncle Vince, who bears a grudge against Mae, knows of the affair and tells his disbelieving nephew. When Jerry confronts the couple, Mae admits that she wants to leave Jerry to be with Earl.

After a few drinks and some prodding by Vince, Jerry finds and starts strangling Earl until Mae arrives and breaks up the fight. Jerry leaves, horrified that he came close to killing his friend. When Mae goes home to take her baby away, she finds the crib empty. Earl tries to coax Mae to leave with him anyway, without the baby, but Mae refuses. After trading bitter recriminations, she breaks up with him. Later, Mae repents and convinces Jerry to take her back.

Cast
 Barbara Stanwyck as Mae Doyle D'Amato
 Paul Douglas as Jerry D'Amato
 Robert Ryan as Earl Pfeiffer
 Marilyn Monroe as Peggy
 Keith Andes as Joe Doyle
 Silvio Minciotti as Papa D'Amato
 J. Carrol Naish as Uncle Vince
 Diane and Deborah Stewart as Gloria D'Amato

Background
Clifford Odets' Clash by Night was originally performed in 1941 as a neo-realist Broadway play with Tallulah Bankhead in the Stanwyck role. Fritz Lang changed the locale from Staten Island to a fishing town in California, but kept intact the oppressive seacoast atmosphere.

The drama is structured into two almost equal parts, separated by a year in time, and each is almost a complete drama in its own. Each section begins with a non-fiction documentary look at the fishing industry in Monterey, California before moving on to the story. The film could be considered as two separate films strung together as a serial.

The film's title is derived from Matthew Arnold's 1851 poem "Dover Beach", which describes the titular location as a place "where ignorant armies clash by night."

Joan Crawford was originally announced as the film's star.

Reception

Critical response
A contemporary Variety review panned the film but appreciated Stanwyck's work, writing, "Clifford Odets' Clash by Night, presented on Broadway over a decade earlier, reaches the screen in a rather aimless drama of lust and passion. Clash captures much of the drabness of the seacoast fishing town, background of the pic, but only occasionally does the narrative's suggested intensity seep through...Barbara Stanwyck plays the returning itinerant with her customary defiance and sullenness. It is one of her better performances. Robert Ryan plays the other man with grim brutality while Marilyn Monroe is reduced to what is tantamount to a bit role."

In another contemporary review, New York Times critic A.H. Weiler wrote that the film "... lacks conviction and distinction despite its hard-working principals. ... Miss Stanwyck is professionally realistic in the role. Paul Douglas is a physically convincing portrait of the simple, muscular and trusting Jerry. But it is difficult to take his extreme idealistic devotion."

Critic Sam Adams wrote about Fritz Lang's directorial style: "Restraint was never Fritz Lang's problem. Indeed, his version of Clifford Odets' Clash by Night is overwrought verging on camp... In Clash's wild kingdom, strong women can only be sated by the threat of male violence: After she marries sturdy lug Paul Douglas, Stanwyck is unerringly drawn towards Ryan's volatile woman-hater, while fish-canner Marilyn Monroe shows her affection to fiance Keith Andes by socking him in the arm, a gesture he threatens to return in spades. Lang tilled the same turf two years later in Human Desire, a similarly heavy-handed expose of man's bestial nature. Perhaps Lang should have stuck with the style of Clash's extraordinary, near-wordless opening, which begins with shots of seagulls and seals and slowly mixes in the actors in their natural habitats."

Critic Dennis Schwartz wrote: "The performances are stagy but filled with fiery emotion. The performers are able to bring out the complexities underlying each of their characters as they battle each other, hoping not to die of loneliness or of cynicism. Everything about these characters and their alienation seemed natural, something that was grounded by Lang's showing them at work, never cutting them off from all the other travails they were going through. Lang's point is how easy it is not to see the faults in yourself, as easy as it is to see them in someone else. Clash by Night brilliantly tells how some lonely folks break out from their shadowy existence, as if that darkness was a prison where survival at any cost is the name of the game."

The review aggregator Rotten Tomatoes reports that 73% of critics gave the film a positive review, based on 15 reviews, marking the film as "Fresh."

Adaptation
Another production of the Odets play was directed by John Frankenheimer for Playhouse 90 on June 13, 1957, with Kim Stanley in the lead role.

References

External links

 
 
 
 
 
 Clash by Night at DVD Beaver (includes images)
 

1952 films
1952 drama films
American black-and-white films
American drama films
American films based on plays
Film noir
Films based on works by Clifford Odets
Films directed by Fritz Lang
Films scored by Roy Webb
Films set in California
RKO Pictures films
1950s English-language films
1950s American films